The golden mean or golden middle way is the desirable middle between two extremes, one of excess and the other of deficiency.  It appeared in Greek thought at least as early as the Delphic maxim "nothing in excess", was discussed in Plato's Philebus.  Aristotle analyzed the golden mean in the Nicomachean Ethics Book II: That virtues of character can be described as means.  It was subsequently emphasized in Aristotelian virtue ethics.
 
For example, in the Aristotelian view, courage is a virtue, but if taken to excess would manifest as recklessness, and, in deficiency, cowardice.

History

Western philosophy

Crete
The earliest representation of this idea in culture is probably in the mythological Cretan tale of Daedalus and Icarus. Daedalus, a famous artist of his time, built feathered wings for himself and his son so that they might escape the clutches of  King Minos. Daedalus warns his beloved son whom he loved so much to "fly the middle course", between the sea spray and the sun's heat. Icarus did not heed his father; he flew up and up until the sun melted the wax off his wings. For not heeding the middle course, he fell into the sea and drowned.

Delphi
Another early elaboration is the Doric saying carved on the front of the temple at Delphi: "Nothing in excess" ("Μηδὲν ἄγαν").

Cleobulus
To Cleobulus is attributed the maxim: Μέτρον ἄριστον ("Moderation is best")

Socrates
Socrates teaches that a man must know "how to choose the mean and avoid the extremes on either side, as far as possible."

In education, Socrates asks us to consider the effect of either an exclusive devotion to gymnastics or an exclusive devotion to music. It either "produced a temper of hardness and ferocity, (or) the other of softness and effeminacy."  Having both qualities, he believed, produces harmony; i.e., beauty and goodness.

Plato
Proportion's relation to beauty and goodness is stressed throughout Plato's dialogues, particularly in the Republic and Philebus. He writes (Phlb. 64d–65a):

In the Laws, Plato applies this principle to electing a government in the ideal state: "Conducted in this way, the election will strike a mean between monarchy and democracy …"

Aristotle
In the Eudemian Ethics, Aristotle writes on the virtues. Aristotle’s theory on virtue ethics is one that does not see a person’s actions as a reflection of their ethics but rather looks into the character of a person as the reason behind their ethics. His constant phrase is,  "… is the Middle state between …".  His psychology of the soul and its virtues is based on the golden mean between the extremes. In the Politics, Aristotle criticizes the Spartan Polity by critiquing the disproportionate elements of the constitution; e.g., they trained the men and not the women, and they trained for war but not peace. This disharmony produced difficulties which he elaborates on in his work. See also the discussion in the Nicomachean Ethics of the golden mean, and Aristotelian ethics in general.

Eastern philosophy
Gautama Buddha (fl. 6th century BC) taught of the Middle Way, a path between the extremes of religious asceticism and worldly self-indulgence.

Confucius in The Analects, written through the Warring States period of Ancient China (c. 479 BC – 221 BC), taught excess is similar to deficiency. A way of living in the mean is the way of Zhongyong.

Zhuangzi was the Tao's most famous commentator (369–286 BC).

Tiruvalluvar (2nd century BC and the 8th century AD; date disputed) in his Tirukkural of the Sangam period of Tamizhagam writes of the middle state which is to preserve equity. He emphasises this principle and suggests that the two ways of preserving equity is to be impartial and avoid excess. Parimelazhagar was the historical commentator of the Tirukkural.

Judaism

Rambam in Mishneh Torah attributes this method to the first scholars (Chazal), and to Abraham. Indeed, a similar concept exists even in the Rabbinic literature, Tosefta and the Yerushalmi. Yitzhak Arama finds references even in the Bible.

One such instance is Ecclesiastes 7:15-16 , where the preacher admonishes his audience to "be not righteous over much" and to "be not over much wicked." Adam Clarke takes the phrase "righteous over much" to mean indulging in too much "austerity and hard study,"  and concludes that “there is no need of all this watching, fasting, praying, self-denial, etc., you carry things to extremes. Why should you wish to be reputed singular and precise?”  Thus, the ideal of the golden mean may have existed as long as six hundred years before Aristotle. However, some scholars, such as Albert Barnes, hold a slightly different interpretation of Ecclesiastes 7:16-17. 

Ahead of the times Rambam, 1138-1204 AD (probably due to Plato's and Aristotle’s engagement with Ethics), determined that a person has to take care of his soul as well as his body, and just as a person who is sick in his body turns to the doctor, a person who has mental illness needs to go to the doctor of the soul, which is, according to him, the philosopher or the sage. Rambam opposed the deterministic approach, arguing that a person has free will and the ability to change its properties.

The golden mean is also a core principle in Musar literature in which practitioners are encouraged to bring every character trait (middah; plural middot) into a balanced place between extremes. For example, it is not good to have too much patience, but it is not good to live without any patience at all. Musar can be said to involve being mindful enough to bring one's character traits, thoughts and desires into a balanced state in real time; living one's life in accord with the golden mean.

Christianity
Saint Thomas Aquinas, OP, the medieval Catholic philosopher and theologian, in his Summa Theologiae, Prima Secundæ Partis, Question 64, argued that Christian morality is consistent with the mean: "evil consists in discordance from their rule or measure. Now this may happen either by their exceeding the measure or by their falling short of it[.] ... Therefore it is evident that moral virtue observes the mean."

Islam
Islam promotes the golden mean in many instances.  The Quran states an example in finance, in that a person should not spend all he makes as not to be caught needing, and not to be stingy as to not live a comfortable life. Muhammad also had a saying "خير الأمور أوسطها" meaning the best choice is the middle ground/golden mean one. In Quran (Chapter 'The Cow', verse number 143) it is said that, "We have made you a balanced, moderate nation".

Quran quotes the example of two groups of people, calling one of them extremely greedy (Chasing the wealth of the world) in Chapter 'The Cow' verse 96 and to the others as inventors of monasticism (over-zealousness in religion) in Chapter Al-Hadeed verse number 27. Islam counsels its followers to abstain from both these paths of extremities and adopt moderation in chasing the world and practicing religion alike.

Not the least the Quran emphasises that the Muslim community ( Umma) is a ’middle nation’ / a 'just community' / an Umma justly balanced / a moderate nation / a midmost nation (ummatan wasaTan)  in verse 2-143: a middle between extremism and sloppiness.

Hinduism
Many Hindu texts emphasize middle path. For example in verse 6:16 of Gita warrior Arjuna is told by Sri Krishna that "Yoga is not for one who eats too much, or eats too little, sleeps too much or does not sleep enough.

Rajo guna (Hyper), Satva guna (Balanced) and Tamas (Inactive) are 3 traits of matter. All food, things, feelings, thoughts actions many more are classified under these three.. eons old philosophy.

Modernity
Jacques Maritain, throughout his Introduction to Philosophy (1930), uses the idea of the golden mean to place Aristotelian-Thomist philosophy between the deficiencies and extremes of other philosophers and systems.

Quotations

"In many things the middle have the best / Be mine a middle station." — Phocylides
"When Coleridge tried to define beauty, he returned always to one deep thought; beauty, he said, is unity in variety!  Science is nothing else than the search to discover unity in the wild variety of nature,—or, more exactly, in the variety of our experience.  Poetry, painting, the arts are the same search, in Coleridge’s phrase, for unity in variety." — Jacob Bronowski
"…but for harmony beautiful to contemplate, science would not be worth following." — Henri Poincaré.
"If a man finds that his nature tends or is disposed to one of these extremes..., he should turn back and improve, so as to walk in the way of good people, which is the right way.  The right way is the mean in each group of dispositions common to humanity; namely, that disposition which is equally distant from the two extremes in its class, not being nearer to the one than to the other."  — Maimonides
"What is wanted is a balance between extravagance and miserliness through moderation, with the goal of distance between both extremes."  — al-Ghazali

See also
Apatheia
Frugality
Centrism
Neutrality
Argument to moderation (logical fallacy)
Averageness
Doctrine of the Mean (Confucian analog)
Golden ratio (golden mean applied to aesthetics, mathematics, geometry)
Mathematical optimization
Goldilocks principle
Sweet spot
Horseshoe theory
Middle Way (Buddhist analog)
Juste milieu (French political philosophy)
Third Way
Molinism (Middle Knowledge)
Welfare in Sweden
Sweden: the Middle Way
Lagom

Notes

References
 Eudemian Ethics, 1233b15
 Laws, 691c, 756e–757a
 Nicomachean Ethics, 1106a–b
 Politics, 1270a and 1271b
 Republic (Plato), 619

Bibliography
The Greek Way, Edith Hamilton, W. W. Norton & Co., NY, 1993.
Sailing the Wine-Dark Sea, Why the Greeks Matter, Thomas Cahill, Nan A. Talese an imprint of Doubleday, NY, 2003.

Theories in ancient Greek philosophy
Pythagorean philosophy
Concepts in ancient Greek ethics